Isolde Lasoen (born 31 December 1979 in Bruges) is a Belgian (Flemish) drummer and singer.

Biography
At the age of four, Lasoen started with the fanfare orchestra Nut en Vermaak in Maldegem. After secondary school she studied jazz at the Royal Conservatory of Ghent. She is the drummer in bands like Daan, Saint-Marteau, The Happy (new project with among others Reinhard Vanbergen from Das Pop), Isolde et Les Bens (old French and English songs), Briskey and The Whodads. She also works or worked as freelancer with Guido Belcanto, Willy Willy, Flip Kowlier, Raymond van het Groenewoud, Nic Balthazar, Novastar, Jack Van Poll, Lady Linn, Kapotski and others.

In two of Daan's latest albums, Simple and Le Franc Belge, Lasoen outed herself as allround musician: in these records she took care of vocals, drums, vibraphone, trumpet, bass synth and percussion. She also combines these instruments during live acts.
Because of this, and mainly because of her singing, Isolde Lasoen appeared more on the forefront, which leads to more solo work. One example is her single "Aluminium Folie", which she recorded with Les Bens, brought out in December 2012.

Lasoen teaches drumming at the Institute for Music and Dance (MUDA), a secondary school for arts in Ghent.

Discography

References

Living people
1979 births
Belgian drummers
Musicians from Ghent
21st-century Belgian women singers
21st-century Belgian singers
21st-century drummers